Hausa Folk-lore is a book by Maalam Shaihua, translated by R. Sutherland Rattray, published in 1913. In two volumes, it contains a pronunciation guide, thirty folk-stories of the Hausa people of Africa (twenty-one in volume I, nine in volume II) as well as some information regarding their customs. The book is notable in that it was actually written by one of the Hausa, not a European, as is common in such books from the time period.

External links 
Hausa Folk-lore, volume I
Hausa Folk-lore, volume II

1913 books
African folklore
Books about Africa
Mythology books
Hausa-language culture